Johnstown is an unincorporated community in Jefferson Township, Greene County, Indiana.

Geography

References

Unincorporated communities in Greene County, Indiana
Unincorporated communities in Indiana
Bloomington metropolitan area, Indiana